Jet Airliner may refer to:

 Jet airliner, an aeroplane powered by jet engines
 "Jet Airliner" (Steve Miller Band song), a 1977 song composed by Paul Pena and popularized by the Steve Miller Band
 "Jet Airliner" (Modern Talking song), Modern Talking's first single from the fifth album Romantic Warriors

See also
 Jetliner (disambiguation)